The Assam football team is an Indian football team representing Assam in Indian state football competitions including the Santosh Trophy.

Current squad 
As of 26 December 2022:

Current coaching staff

Honours 
National Games
 Gold medal (1): 2007
 Silver medal (1): 1999

 B.C. Roy Trophy
 Runners-up (4): 1963–64, 1969–70, 1984–85, 1996–97

 Mir Iqbal Hussain Trophy
 Winners (4): 1980, 1981, 1981–82, 2011–12
 Runners-up (1): 1983–84

 M. Dutta Ray Trophy
 Runners-up (1): 1994

References

Santosh Trophy teams
Football in Assam